"Beside You"  is the second track on Astral Weeks, the 1968 album by Northern Irish singer-songwriter Van Morrison and released by Warner Bros. Records.

Recording and composition
The song was recorded during the first Astral Weeks recording session at Century Sound Studios in New York City on 25 September 1968 with Lewis Merenstein as producer.

Van Morrison remarked on this song: "'Beside You' is the kind of song that you'd sing to a kid or somebody you love.  It's basically a love song, just a song about being spiritually beside somebody." The child that would have inspired the song was his adopted son by Janet, his wife at that time. It is sung with a "hushed wonder" and in it the singer transfers the visions of his own childhood to his son.

Jack Lynch wrote in 1983:

The opening image of Little Jimmy shows a child sneaking out of his home, escaping to adventure and a childlike ritual rendezvous. Broken Arrow, possibly his fantasy figure, beckons – innocence led by imagination on the road to experience.

Acclaim
Singer-songwriter Elvis Costello has identified this song as one of his favourites, featuring on one of his 500 favourite albums. Robert Pattinson of Twilight fame, when asked in an interview what his favourite song was, replied that it was "Beside You".

Appearance on other albums
"Beside You" was featured on Morrison's album Astral Weeks Live at the Hollywood Bowl, released in 2009 to celebrate forty years since Astral Weeks was first released.

An alternate version of "Beside You" (6:05) appears on the album Bang Masters (recorded in 1967, released in 1991), featuring Van Morrison on electric guitar rather than an acoustic. An electric guitar version of this song also appears on The Authorized Bang Collection (released in 2017), listed as "Beside You (Take 5)."

Covers
Cara Robinson
Australian blues and root band The Revelators covered the song on their 2000 album, The Adventures of The Amazing Revelators.

Personnel
Van Morrison – vocals, acoustic guitar
Jay Berliner – classical guitar
Richard Davis – double bass
Anonymous – flute
Warren Smith, Jr. – vibraphone

References

Sources
Heylin, Clinton (2003). Can You Feel the Silence? Van Morrison: A New Biography, Chicago Review Press 
Hinton, Brian (1997). Celtic Crossroads: The Art of Van Morrison, Sanctuary,

External links
[ allmusic.com:Review-Beside You]

1968 songs
Songs written by Van Morrison
Van Morrison songs
Song recordings produced by Lewis Merenstein